The following is a list of dams and reservoirs in Iraq. They are sorted according to their location in either the Euphrates or the Tigris river basin.

Dams in the Euphrates basin
Duban Regulator, on the Euphrates, regulating the flow of the Euphrates into Lake Habbaniyah
Fallujah Barrage, on the Euphrates
Haditha Dam, on the Euphrates, creating Lake Qadisiyah
Hindiya Barrage, on the Hindiya branch of the Euphrates
Ramadi Barrage, on the Euphrates
Warrar Regulator, on the Euphrates
Three dams in Wadi Hauran (Hussayniyah dam, Rutba dam, and the Hauran dam)

Dams in the Tigris basin
Adhaim Dam, on the Adhaim River
Alwand Dam, on the Alwand River
Badush Dam (incomplete), on the Tigris
Bastora Dam (under construction), on the Bastora River
Bawanur Dam (under construction), on the Diyala River
Beduhe Dam, on the Beduhe River
Bekhme Dam (incomplete), on the Great Zab
Darbandikhan Dam, on the Diyala River
Deralok Dam (under construction), on the Great Zab
Dibis Dam, on the Little Zab
Diyala Weir, on the Diyala River
Dukan Dam, on the Little Zab, creating Lake Dukan
Duhok Dam, on the Duhok River
Hemrin Dam, on the Diyala River, creating Lake Hamrin
Kut Barrage, on the Tigris
Mosul Dam, on the Tigris
Samarra Dam, on the Tigris

Dams in waterways connecting the Tigris and Euphrates basins
Badaa Head Regulator, on the Shatt al-Hayy
Gharraf Head regulator, on the Shatt al-Hayy
Gharraf Regulators, on the Shatt al-Hayy
Shallala Weir, on a canal from Lake Tharthar to the Tigris
Tharthar Diversion Structure, regulating the flow from Lake Tharthar
Thartar Canal Control Structure, regulating the flow from Lake Tharthar toward either the Euphrates or the tigris

See also 

 List of rivers of Iraq

References

Iraq, Dams and reservoirs in
Reservoirs

Dams and reservoirs